Percy Streeter (29 July 1911 – 19 December 1973) was  a former Australian rules footballer who played with Melbourne and Footscray in the Victorian Football League (VFL).

Notes

External links 

1911 births
1973 deaths
Australian rules footballers from Victoria (Australia)
Melbourne Football Club players
Western Bulldogs players